The Mello Hippo Disco Show is an EP released by Amorphous Androgynous, a pseudonym of The Future Sound of London.  Among the tracks are Life's A Flow, which was originally released on the Abbey Road mix of The Isness and the long-awaited Trying To Make Impermanent Things Permanent, originally premiered in 1997

Track listing 
 Yo-Yo (5:21)
 She Sells Electric Ego (6:43)
 The Mello Hippo Disco Show (Jacknife Lee Mix) (4:23)
 Remix – Jacknife Lee
 Slo-Mo (4:57)
 Hippo-Drone (2:46)
 Trying To Make Impermanent Things Permanent (3:31)
 The World's In Transience (1:52)
 Life's A Flow (4:21)

Crew 
 Cello – Christine Jackson, Helena Binney, Jane Fenton
 Choir – Adrian Osmond, Christine Settle, Gloria Gee, Jacqueline Goddard, John-Llewelyn Evans, Jon English, Rechenda Elmhurst
 Engineer – Yage
 Flute – Chris Margary
 Harp – Thelma Owen
 Horns – Philip Eastop
 Mellotron, Organ, Keyboards – Mikey Rowe
 Oboe – Kate St. John
 Synthesizer – Daniel Pemberton
 Trombone – Fayaz Virgi, Mark Eades
 Trumpet – Dominic Glover
 Violin – Jo Archard, Mark McEvoy, Morven Bryce, Sarah Tilley
 Vocals – Anjali Saga

References

External links 
 

2002 songs
The Future Sound of London EPs